Arman Geghamyan (born 12 September 1981) is an Armenian Greco Roman wrestler.

Geghamyan was a member of the Armenian Greco-Roman wrestling team at the 2009 Wrestling World Cup. The Armenian team came in third place. Geghamyan personally won a bronze medal.

Geghamyan was a member of the Armenian Greco-Roman wrestling team at the 2009 and 2010 Wrestling World Cup. The Armenian team came in third place both years. Geghamyan personally won a bronze medal in 2009 and a silver medal in 2010.

References

1981 births
Living people
Armenian male sport wrestlers
21st-century Armenian people